Dan Jiao from Purdue University, West Lafayette, IN was named Fellow of the Institute of Electrical and Electronics Engineers (IEEE) in 2016 for contributions to computational electromagnetics.

References

Fellow Members of the IEEE
Living people
Year of birth missing (living people)
Place of birth missing (living people)
Purdue University faculty
American electrical engineers